Jan de Hoey (1544–1615) was a Dutch Renaissance painter.

Biography
According to Houbraken he was born in Leiden, and though he could not discover who taught him to paint, he managed to have an illustrious international career and became manager of the art cabinet of the French king Henry IV of France.
Houbraken quoted Fl. le Comte as his source.

According to the RKD he was the brother of Lucas de Hoey, grandson of Lucas van Leyden, and the father of the painter Nicolas van Houy.
He was active in Troyes, Paris, and at the Palace of Fontainebleau, and died at nearby Avon, Seine-et-Marne. His works are often confused with those of his son Nicolas.

References

1544 births
1615 deaths
Dutch Renaissance painters
Artists from Leiden